Sterculia quadrifida, also known as the peanut tree, monkey nut or red-fruited kurrajong is a small  tree that grows in the rainforests, vine thickets, and gallery forests of New Guinea and northern Australia.

The bark is a light grey and the leaves are dark green and broad egg-shaped or sometimes heart-shaped at the base. The flowers, which are greenish-yellow and are borne in small clusters in the upper axils, occur from November to January (summer in Australia).

Seed pods are orange outside and orange or red inside when ripe. These pods contain up to 8 black seeds that are edible and taste like raw peanuts.

The bitter black coating on the seeds is removed before consumption.

Alternative common names for this species include kuman, orange-fruited kurrajong, orange-fruited sterculia, red-fruited kurrajong, smooth-seeded kurrajong, white crowsfoot and small-flowered kurrajong.

The bark is used by Aboriginal people in their traditional weaving techniques to make baskets and other products.

References

External links
  PlantNet reference

quadrifida
Trees of Australia
Flora of Queensland
Australian Aboriginal bushcraft
Malvales of Australia
Edible nuts and seeds
Bushfood